The Lakeba State denotes the first Lauan state in what is now Lau Province, Fiji.

It was first controlled by Lakeba. They were then consolidated by the Cekena Dynasty by the end of the 17th century. This included the following southern Lau Islands:
 Kabara and its dependencies, Vuaqava, Marabo, Tavunasici, Komo, Fiji and Namuka
 Fulaga and its dependencies, Ogea Levu and Ogea Driki
 Ono-i-Lau and its dependency Vatoa
 Oneata
 Moce

References 

Vuanirewa